Joy of life may refer to:

In language
 Joie de vivre, a French expression often used in English to express the exuberant joy of being alive

In art
 Le bonheur de vivre, a 1906 painting by Henri Matisse
 Joy of Life, a 1911 painting by Suzanne Valadon
 Joy of Living, a 1938 film directed by Tay Garnett, starring Irene Dunne and  Douglas Fairbanks Jr.
 Joy of Living; The Art of Renoir, a 1952 documentary about the work of painter Pierre-Auguste Renoir
 The Joy of Living (Quelle joie de vivre), a 1961 film directed by René Clément
 The Joy of Life, a 2005 American film
 Joys of Life, a 2012 Singaporean television series
 Joy of Life (TV series), a 2019 Chinese television series

In music
 Joie De Vivre (band), an American emo band from Rockford, Illinois.
 The Joy of Living, an autobiographical song by British folk singer Ewan MacColl.